Sabine Glacier is a 13.5 km long glacier on the north side of Detroit Plateau, flowing from Mount Bris and Tsarevets Buttress northwards along the east slopes of Korten Ridge, and terminating at the sea in Jordanoff Bay on Davis Coast in Graham Land, Antarctica. Captain Henry Foster gave the name "Cape Sabine" in 1829 to a feature lying southeast of Cape Kater but it has not been possible to identify that cape. This toponym preserves the early use of Sabine in this area. Sir Edward Sabine (1788-1883), English astronomer and geodesist, was a member of the committee which planned the 1829 voyage of Foster in the Chanticleer.

Map
 Trinity Peninsula. Scale 1:250000 topographic map No. 5697. Institut für Angewandte Geodäsie and British Antarctic Survey, 1996.

References
 SCAR Composite Antarctic Gazetteer.

Glaciers of Davis Coast